This is a List of Los Angeles Historic-Cultural Monuments on the Westside.  In total, there are more than 85 Historic-Cultural Monuments (HCM) on the Westside, and a handful of additional sites that have been recognized by the Cultural Heritage Commission for having been designated as California Historical Landmarks or having been listed on the National Register of Historic Places. They are designated by the city's Cultural Heritage Commission.

Overview of the Westside's Historic-Cultural Monuments
As a more recently developed section of the city, the Westside initially lagged behind other parts of the city in the designation of HCMs.  In the first 20 years of the Cultural Heritage Commission's existence (August 1962 - August 1982), only three buildings (and three trees or groups of trees) on the Westside were designated as Historic-Cultural Monuments.  The three buildings so designated are: (1) Rocha House -- (2) Hangar No. 1 -- the first building constructed at the airfield that later became LAX; and (3) the Ivy Park Substation, an electric generating station for the Pacific Electric Railway located on Venice Boulevard in Palms.  Although the city's Westside became a center of wealth and architectural innovation in the mid-20th century, it was not until the 1980s that large numbers of buildings on the Westside began to be recognized as Historic-Cultural Monuments.

Listing of the Historic-Cultural Monuments

Non-HCM sites also recognized
The LA HCM sites listed above include many of the most important historic sites in the westside area.  Some others within L.A. in the area have been listed on the National Register of Historic Places or designated as California Historical Landmarks.  These are:

See also

Lists of L.A. Historic-Cultural Monuments
 Historic-Cultural Monuments in Downtown Los Angeles
 Historic-Cultural Monuments on the East and Northeast Sides
 Historic-Cultural Monuments in the Harbor area
 Historic-Cultural Monuments in Hollywood
 Historic-Cultural Monuments in the San Fernando Valley
 Historic-Cultural Monuments in Silver Lake, Angelino Heights, and Echo Park
 Historic-Cultural Monuments in South Los Angeles

 Historic-Cultural Monuments in the Wilshire and Westlake areas

Other
 City of Los Angeles' Historic Preservation Overlay Zones
 National Register of Historic Places listings in Los Angeles
 National Register of Historic Places listings in Los Angeles County
 List of California Historical Landmarks

References

External links
 official Designated L.A. Historic-Cultural Monuments (LAHCM) website — with 'ever-updated' LAHCM list via PDF link.
 City of Los Angeles Map, with community districts. — via Given Place Media.
 Big Orange Landmarks:  "Exploring the Landmarks of Los Angeles, One Monument at a Time" — online photos and in-depth history of L.A.H.C. Monuments; see “Landmarks by Community Planning Area” Westside links — website curator: Floyd B. Bariscale.
http://www.rockethub.com/projects/42307-save-tarzan-s-home

 
Westside
Los Angeles-related lists